The Col. Ralph Andrews House is a historic house at 517 W. Center St. in Beebe, Arkansas.  Built c. 1885, it is one of a small number of houses in Beebe to survive from the early period of the city's growth.  It is a -story wood-frame structure, with clapboard siding, and a Folk Victorian porch with turned posts and jigsawn brackets.  The building's cruciform plan is fairly typical of houses built in White County during the period; this is one of the best-preserved of those that remain.

The house was listed on the National Register of Historic Places in 1991.

See also
National Register of Historic Places listings in White County, Arkansas

References

Houses on the National Register of Historic Places in Arkansas
Houses completed in 1885
Houses in White County, Arkansas
National Register of Historic Places in White County, Arkansas
Buildings and structures in Beebe, Arkansas
Folk Victorian architecture in the United States
Victorian architecture in Arkansas
1885 establishments in Arkansas